John of Antioch was a 7th-century chronicler, who wrote in Greek. He was a monk, apparently contemporary with Emperor Heraclius (reigned 610–41). Heinrich Gelzer identifies the author with the Monophysite Syrian Orthodox Patriarch of Antioch John of the Sedre, who ruled from 630 to 648.

Historia chronike 
John of Antioch's chronicle, Historia chronike, is a universal history stretching from Adam to the death of Phocas; it is one of the many adaptations and imitations of the better known chronicle of John Malalas. His sources include Sextus Julius Africanus, Eusebius, and Ammianus Marcellinus. Only fragments remain.

The fragments of the chronicle are contained in two collections, the Codex Parisinus 1763, which was published in an edition by Claudius Salmasius, and the encyclopedia of history in fifty-three chapters made by order of Constantine VII Porphyrogenitus (912–59), the so-called Excerpta Constantiniana. Of the Constantinian collection only parts remain. Two titles: "Of Virtue and Vice" and "Of Conspiracies against Emperors" contain the literary remains of John of Antioch. A difficulty arises from the fact that a great part of the extracts (from the Roman Commonwealth of Justin I) differs considerably from the corresponding quotations in the Salmasian collection. The Constantinian passages are of the nature the old Hellenic writing of history, the Salmasian ones are rather Byzantine and Christian. The Salmasian compilation is older, and so appears to be the original text; the other is no doubt a re-arrangement made under the influence of the Hellenic Renaissance started by  patriarch Photius. But some authorities see in them two different originals and speak of a "Constantinian" and a "Salmasian" John of Antioch.

The Salmasian excerpts are edited by Cramer, Anecdota Graecae cod. mss. regiae Parisiensis, II, Oxford 1839, 383–401. Both series of fragments are in C. Muller, "Fragmenta Historicorum Graecorum", vol. IV, Paris, 1883, 535–622; V, 27–8.

Editions
Mariev, Sergei (ed.). Ioannis Antiocheni fragmenta quae supersunt omnia. Corpus Fontium Historiae Byzantinae – Series Berolinensis, Volume 47. De Gruyter, 2008. . Contains Greek text with English translation.

References

Bibliography
 Fortescue, A. (1910). "John of Antioch". In The Catholic Encyclopedia. New York: Robert Appleton Company. Retrieved May 23, 2009 from New Advent.

7th-century Byzantine monks
7th-century Byzantine historians
Byzantine chroniclers
People from Antioch